The Plantation Garden is a restored Victorian town garden located off Earlham Road, Norwich, Norfolk. , visitors are asked to pay £2 to visit the garden, which is open daily throughout the year.

The garden
The Plantation Garden is a restored Victorian town garden, maintained by volunteers, located in a former chalk quarry in Norwich. It includes a 'Gothic' fountain, flower beds, lawns, woodland walkways, rustic bridge, Italianate terrace, ‘Medieval’ terrace wall; and hundreds of architectural details fashionable in the mid 19th century. This idiosyncratic creation was described by The Telegraph as "a tycoon's folly".

History
The garden, located on Earlham Road, was established 140 years ago in a  abandoned quarry by Henry Trevor, a Norwich shopkeeper. Over a period of 40 years, the gardens became a showpiece that featured terraces, water features and rockeries surrounded by a large fountain, all styled on Italian Renaissance designs. It once featured eight glasshouses. The design may have been influenced by the architect Edward Boardman, who worked for Trevor on other projects. After Trevor died in 1897, the gardens slowly became neglected.

After falling into complete disrepair after the Second World War, the garden was abandoned. In 1980 the Plantation Garden Preservation Trust was established with the aim of rescuing and restoring the garden for the public. The art historian Roy Strong is a patron of the trust.

In April 2016, the garden was forced to close as a result of structural damage to the terrace wall, following the collapse of an old mining tunnel in Earlham Road. The garden reopened on 23 April 2016. After three sinkholes opened up near the garden, Norwich City Council arranged to carry out underground probing work at the site, which was planned for 31 January 2017. Entrances to the garden were sealed off on 28 January. After further safety tests the garden reopened to the public on 15 March 2017.

References

Sources

External links

The Plantation Garden website
Norwich Plantation Garden from Tour Norfolk

Parks and open spaces in Norwich
Gardens in Norfolk